Hope Ramsey Robertson (17 January 1868 – 27 September 1927) was a Scottish footballer who played in the English Football League for Bootle, Everton and Walsall Town Swifts, and in the Scottish Football League for Partick Thistle. He played in the first ever competitive match at Goodison Park in front of 14,000 spectators, a short time before leaving Everton.

References

1868 births
1927 deaths
Scottish footballers
Arsenal F.C. players
Partick Thistle F.C. players
Everton F.C. players
Bootle F.C. (1879) players
Walsall F.C. players
English Football League players
Scottish Football League players
Association football defenders
Association football midfielders
People from Whiteinch
Footballers from Glasgow